Heliocheilus thomalae is a moth in the family Noctuidae. It is found in Tanzania.

Gaede named this species after Miss Thomala, preparator at the Berlin Museum für Naturkunde who draw his attention on this species.

References

Endemic fauna of Tanzania
Heliocheilus
Moths described in 1915
Insects of Tanzania
Moths of Africa